Events from the year 1561 in Ireland.

Incumbent
Monarch: Elizabeth I

Events
June 8 – the Earl of Sussex, Lord Lieutenant of Ireland, proclaims Shane O'Neill a traitor and begins a campaign against him which continues until 1567.
July 18 – Battle of the Red Sagums: Shane O'Neill destroys much of Sussex's withdrawing army.
c. July – English troops garrison Armagh Cathedral.
September – Sussex makes an unsuccessful expedition to Lough Foyle.
Elizabeth I of England introduces a higher standard of silver coinage for Ireland.

Births
Risdeard Ó Conchubhair, scribe and physician (d. 1625)
Donal Cam O'Sullivan Beare, clan chief (d. 1618)

Deaths
Sir John Alan, lawyer and statesman (b. c.1500)
Naisse mac Cithruadh, musician (drowned on Lough Gill)

References

1560s in Ireland
Years of the 16th century in Ireland